This is a list of notable people from Assam, India.

Administrators, diplomats and justices

Academicians and scholars

Performing arts

Actors and models

Film directors

Musicians

Activists
Kiran Bala Bora, freedom fighter and social activist 
Muzammil Haque, first martyr of Madhyam movement.
Nabin Chandra Bardoloi, freedom fighter, social activist and writer
 Akhil Gogoi
 Hema Bharali, freedom  fighter and social activist
 Birubala Rabha, social activist
 Chobilal Upadhyaya, freedom fighter and Nepali social activist

Journalists

Literature

 Amrit Bhushan Dev Adhikari
 Ananda Chandra Agarwala
 Chandra Kumar Agarwala
 Jyoti Prasad Agarwala
 Nabin Chandra Bardoloi
 Debo Prasad Barooah
 Amulya Barua
 Ananda Chandra Barua
 Binanda Chandra Barua
 Chandradhar Barua
 Hem Barua
 Hem Barua (Tyagbir)
 Hemchandra Barua
 Jahnavi Barua
 Jnanadabhiram Barua
 Kanaklal Barua
 Nabakanta Barua
 Ananda Ram Baruah
 Bhubanmohan Baruah
 Padmanath Gohain Baruah
 Parvati Prasad Baruva
 Lakshminath Bezbaroa
 Debananda Bharali
 Chandra Bharati
 Birendra Kumar Bhattacharya
 Kamalakanta Bhattacharya
 Nalinidhar Bhattacharya
 Hiren Bhattacharyya
 Bhattadeva
 Nakul Chandra Bhuyan
 Dhrubajyoti Bora
 Mahim Bora
 Satyanath Bora
 Rajanikanta Bordoloi
 Homen Borgohain
 Abani Chakraborty
 Saurabh Kumar Chaliha
 Raghunath Choudhary
 Ambika Charan Choudhury
 Lakshyadhar Choudhury
 Rebati Mohan Dutta Choudhury
 Mithinga Daimary
 Jogesh Das
 Birendra Nath Datta (1935-)
 Bhabananda Deka
 Harekrishna Deka
 Nalini Bala Devi
 Robin Dey
 Utpal Dutta
 Srutimala Duara
 Jatindra Nath Duwara
 Bhusana Dvija
 Pitambar Dvija
 Gopalacharana Dwija
 Ganesh Gogoi
 Hiren Gohain
 Gopaldev
 Hemchandra Goswami
 Sarat Chandra Goswami
 Krishna Kanta Handique
 Atul Chandra Hazarika
 Dhruba Hazarika
 Mafizuddin Ahmed Hazarika
 Tabu Taid
 Banikanta Kakati
 Ananta Kandali
 Madhava Kandali
 Rudra Kandali
 Durgabar Kayastha
 Madhavdev
 Syed Abdul Malik
 Rongbong Terang
 Kaliram Medhi
 Gopala Mishra
 Dimbeswar Neog (1899–1967)
 Nilmani Phookan (1933-) 
 Anandaram Dhekial Phukan
 Mitra Phukan
 Arupa Kalita Patangia
 Sarmistha Pritam
 Anuradha Sharma Pujari
 Bishnuprasad Rabha
 Benudhar Rajkhowa
 Jyoti Prasad Rajkhowa
 Khiren Roy
 Bhabendra Nath Saikia
 Jaideep Saikia
 Sankardev
 Hema Saraswati
 Brajanath Sarma
 Phani Sarma
 Siddhartha Sarma
 Imran Shah
 Arun Sharma
 Benudhar Sharma
 Sonaram Chutia
 Harivara Vipra

Poets

Historical figures

Politicians

Religious leaders

Sports

Archer
 Jayanta Talukdar

Athletes
 Tayabun Nisha
 Bhogeswar Baruah, won gold medal at 1966 Asian Games
 Hima Das

Badminton player
 Dipankar Bhattacharjee, Indian badminton player
 Ashmita Chaliha

Boxers
 Jamuna Boro
 Shiva Thapa
 Lovlina Borgohain, won a bronze medal at the 2020 Summer Olympics

Bodybuilding
 Mahadev Deka
 Gautam Kalita

Cricketers
 Abu Nechim, former Mumbai Indians fast bowler
 Gokul Sharma
 Riyan Parag, plays for Rajasthan Royals in IPL
 Jogeswar Bhumij

Footballers
 Debashish Roy, former Indian national footballer
 Gilbertson Sangma, former Indian national footballer
 Babul Phukan, former Indian national footballer
 Jewel Bey, former Indian national footballer
 Anjana Saikia, Indian national woman footballer
 Holicharan Narzary, ISL and Indian national footballer
 Alen Deory, ISL and Indian national footballer
 Durga Boro, former ISL footballer
 Baoringdao Bodo, ISL and Indian national footballer
 Pranjal Bhumij, ISL footballer
 Pragyan Gogoi, ISL footballer
 Vinit Rai, ISL and Indian national footballer
 Gaurav Bora, ISL footballer
 Milan Basumatary
 Bilifang Nazary

Tennis player
 Somdev Devvarman

Table Tennis player
 Monalisa Baruah Mehta

Naturalists
 Robin Banerjee
 Ananda Chandra Dutta
 Jadav Payeng
 Anwaruddin Choudhury

Others

See also

 People from Western Assam

References 

 
People